"Money" (stylized in all caps) is a song by Thai rapper, singer, and Blackpink member Lisa from her debut single album Lalisa (2021). It was released to US contemporary hit radio by Interscope Records as the second single from the album on November 9, 2021 after achieving viral success. The lyrics for the track were written by Bekuh Boom and Vince, with music being composed by them alongside 24 and R. Tee.

Commercially, "Money" peaked at number ten on the Billboard Global 200 and number seven on the Global Excl. U.S., becoming Lisa's second single to peak within the top ten and subsequently becoming the longest-charting song by a K-pop soloist on both charts. It topped the charts in Malaysia and figured within the record charts of 26 countries, and also became the longest-charting song by a K-pop female soloist on the US Billboard Hot 100 and the UK Singles Chart among others. The song was later certified gold in Poland and Portugal.

Background and release 
On August 25, 2021, YG Entertainment announced that Lisa would make her solo debut with the single album titled after her given name, Lalisa. "Money" was confirmed as the B-side track on the tracklist of the single album on September 5. The song was released alongside the album on September 10, and received a performance video on September 24. Following its release, "Money" trended on TikTok and Instagram Reels in the form of dance covers, transformation edits, and edits to the television series Squid Game, and began to rise in the international charts. In response to its viral success, the song was sent by Interscope Records to US contemporary hit radio as the second single from the album on November 9, 2021.

Composition 
The song's lyrics were written by Bekuh Boom and Vince, and music was composed by them alongside 24 and R. Tee. Lyrically it is a boastful song about being rich and spending cash. The song is composed in the key of E minor and carries a tempo of 140 beats per minute, and is described as a dynamic hip hop song. Nolan Feeney from Billboard explained the music of the song is close to the "contemporary American rap" and is "built around a languid horn loop."

Critical reception 
"Money" received mixed to positive reviews, with Lisa's performance and rapping receiving praise; on the other hand, some criticized the song's composition and lyrical content. Rhian Daly of NME criticized the lyrics as "cringe-y at best" and the sound as "obvious, safe and boring." In a more positive assessment, Starr Bowenbank of Billboard stated that the track exhibits the "full extent of her rap skills, star power and crossover appeal." Writing for Teen Vogue, Maddy Meyer similarly stated that "from the start, this song draws the listener in" and that it "has all the confidence Lisa is known for."

Year-end lists

Performance video 

On September 20, 2021, release of a "exclusive performance video" for "Money" was announced. Initially scheduled for the release on September 23, at 12 a.m. KST, the release was postponed by a day because of the delay in the post-production of the video due to Chuseok holiday. In March 2022, it became the fastest K-pop performance video to reach 500 million views on YouTube, doing so in less than six months.

In the video, Lisa along with the backup dancers gives a choreographed performance for the song in two inter-changing settings. The video starts with Lisa dancing in the middle of an abandoned road wearing a khaki-colored ensemble and green Celine chest. A billboard reading "money is a terrible master but an excellent servant" beams in the background. In the other setting, Lisa wears a checkered crop top and bralette combo, red tap shorts, and fur boots performing in a warehouse with a white LED screen at the back.

A dance practice video was additionally released on October 11, 2021. The dance practice video topped the worldwide trending list on YouTube and reached 10 million views in one day.

Commercial performance 
"Money" debuted at number 44 on the Billboard Global 200 and at number 24 on the Global Excl. U.S. for the chart issue dated September 25, 2021, and rose to number 19 and 11 respectively for the chart issue dated October 16. Following the dance practice video, the song rose from number 19 to 10 on the Global 200 with 66.3 million streams (up 28%) and 4,400 sold (up 6%) for the chart issue dated October 23. The song also rose from number 11 to 7 on the Global Excl. U.S. with 61.5 million streams (up 28%) and 3,000 sold (down 3%) for the same week. This marked Lisa's second top-ten hit on both charts after "Lalisa" and made her the third K-pop artist after BTS and Blackpink to appear in the top ten of the global chart more than once. "Money" charted on the Global 200 for 29 weeks and the Global Excl. U.S. for 34 weeks, becoming the longest charting song by a K-pop soloist and the second-longest charting song by any female K-pop act, behind Blackpink's single "How You Like That". The song also climbed to number five on the Spotify Global Chart and became the most-streamed song by a K-pop soloist on the platform.

In the United States, the song debuted at number eight on Billboards Digital Song Sales chart dated September 25, 2021 with 6,900 online copies sold. It also debuted at number one on Rap Digital Song Sales, making Lisa the first female K-pop artist to so; and at number two on R&B/Hip-Hop Digital Song Sales. For the chart issue dated October 23, the song entered the Bubbling Under Hot 100 at number 7 and Hot R&B/Hip-Hop Songs at number 49 with 4.8 million U.S. streams (up 27%) and 1,300 downloads sold (up 34%). "Money" was the second K-pop song ever to enter the Hot R&B/Hip-Hop Songs chart as well as the highest-charting. It peaked on the Bubbling Under Hot 100 at number 6, for the chart issue dated October 30, and on Hot R&B/Hip-Hop Songs at number 36, for the chart issue dated November 13. "Money" debuted on the Billboard Hot 100 at number 90 on the chart issue dated November 6 as her second career solo entry on the chart after "Lalisa", and went on to become the first song by a female K-pop soloist to chart for multiple weeks. On the chart issue dated December 18, the song debuted on the Billboard Mainstream Top 40 at number 40, the first song by female K-pop soloist to appear on the ranking, and peaked at number 35 on the chart. 

In South Korea, "Money" did not enter the Gaon Digital Chart but peaked at number 43 on the component Gaon Download Chart.  The song also peaked at number one in Malaysia and number two in Singapore. In Canada, the song debuted at number 14 on the Canadian Digital Song Sales chart for the chart issue dated September 25. The song later entered the Canadian Hot 100 at number 95 for the chart issue dated October 9, and peaked at number 37 for the chart issue dated November 6, earning Lisa her first top 40 hit in the country. In the United Kingdom, "Money" debuted at number 81 on the UK Singles Chart and rose to a peak at number 46 for the chart dated October 29. The song charted in the UK for eight weeks, becoming the first song by a female K-pop soloist to spend multiple weeks on the chart and tying Blackpink and Selena Gomez's "Ice Cream" as the second-longest charting song by a female K-pop act.

Accolades

Charts

Weekly charts

Year-end charts

Certifications

Release history

See also 
 List of K-pop songs on the Billboard charts
 List of number-one songs of 2021 (Malaysia)

Notes

References 

2021 songs
Lisa (rapper) songs
Number-one singles in Malaysia